Joseph Daniel Haske (born June 6, 1974 in Sault Saint Marie, Michigan) is an American writer, author of North Dixie Highway. He received the 2011 Boulevard Emerging Writers Award for short fiction.

Early life and education
Haske was born and raised in Sault Ste. Marie in the Upper Peninsula of Michigan. He attended Cedarville High School in Cedarville, Michigan, followed by Lake Superior State University where he graduated in 1999 with a BA in English. Haske was fascinated by naturalist and modernist fiction, as well as Transcendentalist philosophy, which most reflected the way he saw himself in his natural environment. For a brief time, he joined the military and served in the infantry during the Clinton administration. When he returned, he completed his studies in English at Bowling Green State University.

Career
Haske moved in 2003 to McAllen, TX, where he began teaching at South Texas College, and he was the Chair of the English Department there for a few years. 
He completed an MFA at UTRGV (then PanAm University) in Edinburg, Texas. There, he started working on his first novel, North Dixie Highway, a book about the troubled youth of Buck Metzger, a "Yooper" like himself, who seeks to avenge the death of his grandfather.

Publications
Haske wrote for a number of publications, including The Texas Review, The Four-Way Review, Pleiades, Boulevard, Fiction International, Rampike, etc. His work has been translated into French and Romanian and has appeared in Canadian and Romanian publications. He edits for various journals, including Sleipnir and American Book Review.

Books
North Dixie Highway, (Oct 2013, Texas Review Press). This novel goes back and forth in time to show moments from the life of Buck Metzger and his colorful family: his intimidating grandfather, his intelligent grandmother, his rough uncle, his high class girlfriend, in a story of devotion, idealism, violence and tribal revenge.

Personal life
He is married to Bertha, and has two children, Ferny and Joey.

References

External links
Profile in Los Angeles Review of Books
Review in Temporary Knucksline blog
Interview in Words on a Wire
Interview in Enclave
Publication in Romania Literara
Publication in Timpul
Publication in Boema (page 8)

21st-century American writers
People from Sault Ste. Marie, Michigan
Living people
1974 births
Bowling Green State University alumni